Alessandro Tanara (1730-1815) was an Italian physician, numismatist, and writer.

Biography 
He was born in Verona; his father, a lawyer, had him educated first in his native city, then at the University of Padua, under Morgagni and Giulio Pontedera. Alessandro traveled to Florence and Rome, and from ancient manuscripts there edited translations of the ancient Latin works of Aulus Cornelius Celsus, published under the title Celsi Opera'' first printed in Padua in 2 volumes (quarto) in 1769, and again in Verona in 1814.

Targa was also a known numismatist. He taught medicine in Pavia. Hi biography was written by Giovanni Battista Zoppi.

References

1730 births
1815 deaths
19th-century Italian physicians
18th-century Italian writers
18th-century Italian male writers
Italian numismatists
People from Verona